In geography, an arm is a narrow extension, inlet, or smaller reach, of water flowing out from a much larger body of water, such as an ocean, a sea, or a lake. Although different geographically, a sound or bay may also be called an arm.

Both the tributary and distributary of a river are sometimes called an "arm".  By extension, a canal arm is a subsidiary branch of a canal or inland waterway.

See also
River
Channel
Indian Arm
Alice Arm
Gulf of Bothnia

Coastal and oceanic landforms
Bodies of water